George William Glasscodine  (7 August 1856 – 15 December 1943) was a Welsh international footballer. He was part of the Wales national football team, playing 1 match on 18 January 1879 against England.

At club level, he played for Oswestry in the 1870s.

He was later a schoolmaster in Oswestry.

See also
 List of Wales international footballers (alphabetical)

References

1856 births
1943 deaths
Welsh footballers
Wales international footballers
Wrexham A.F.C. players
Association football goalkeepers